Sparganopseustis is a genus of moths belonging to the subfamily Tortricinae of the family Tortricidae.

Species
Sparganopseustis acrocharis (Meyrick, 1932)
Sparganopseustis aurolimbana (Zeller, 1866)
Sparganopseustis elimata Meyrick, 1930
Sparganopseustis flaviciliana (Walsingham, 1913)
Sparganopseustis flavicirrata (Walsingham, 1914)
Sparganopseustis garlaczi Razowski & Wojtusiak, 2008
Sparganopseustis geminorum Meyrick, 1932
Sparganopseustis martinana Powell, 1986
Sparganopseustis myrota Meyrick, 1912
Sparganopseustis ningorana (Walsingham, 1914)
Sparganopseustis niveigutta (Walsingham, 1913)
Sparganopseustis tessellata (Walsingham, 1913)
Sparganopseustis unipunctata (Walsingham, 1914)
Sparganopseustis unithicta Razowski & Wojtusiak, 2010

See also
List of Tortricidae genera

References

 , 1986: Synopsis of the classification of Neotropical Tortricinae, with descriptions of new genera and species (Lepidoptera: Tortricidae). Pan-Pacific Entomologist 62: 372–398.
 , 2010: Tortricidae (Lepidoptera) from Peru. Acta Zoologica Cracoviensia 53B (1-2): 73-159. . Full article: .

External links
tortricidae.com

Sparganothini
Tortricidae genera